is a Japanese footballer currently playing as a midfielder for YSCC Yokohama.

Career statistics

Club
.

Notes

References

External links

1992 births
Living people
Japanese footballers
Japanese expatriate footballers
Association football midfielders
J3 League players
YSCC Yokohama players
Japanese expatriate sportspeople in Germany
Expatriate footballers in Germany